La Pagoda, officially known as Laboratorios Jorba, was a building in Madrid designed by Spanish architect Miguel Fisac. It was located near the Avenida de América and served as the headquarters of Laboratorios Jorba, a pharmaceutical company. The popular name of the building refers to the visible structure's resemblance to a pagoda, with each floor rotated 45º from the lower one and joined with a hyperboloid ruled surface. It was controversially demolished in 1999, despite being widely recognised as one of the city's architectural icons.

References

Further reading
 
 

Demolished buildings and structures in Madrid
Office buildings in Madrid
Buildings and structures demolished in 1999